Árpád Henney (Hennel; 24 September 1895 – 21 May 1980) was a Hungarian politician and military officer, who served as Minister without portfolio between 1944 and 1945, in the Nazi-dominated Ferenc Szálasi cabinet. After the Second World War he emigrated to Austria. He was a leading and prominent member of the immigrant Hungarist movement until his death.

References
 Magyar Életrajzi Lexikon

1895 births
1980 deaths
Hungarian soldiers
Government ministers of Hungary
Hungarian people of World War II
Hungarian collaborators with Nazi Germany
Hungarian emigrants to Austria
Arrow Cross Party politicians